Racing is a competition of speed.

Racing may also refer to:

Sports teams

France
 Racing Club de France, a French sports club
 Racing Club de France Football, a French football club
 RC Lens (Racing Club de Lens), a French football club
 RC Lens Féminin, French women's football club
 RC Strasbourg Alsace (Racing Club de Strasbourg Alsace), a French football club
 Racing 92, a French rugby union club
 Paris Basket Racing, a former French basketball club

Spain
 Racing de Ferrol, a Spanish football club
 Racing de Madrid, a former Spanish football club
 Racing de Santander, a Spanish football club

Elsewhere
 Racing Club de Avellaneda, an Argentinean football club
 Racing Club de Montevideo, an Uruguayan football club
 K.R.C. Genk (Koninklijke Racing Club Genk), a Belgian football club
 Racing CH (Racing Club Haïtien), a Haitian football club
 Racing Club Warwick F.C., an English football club
 Racing FC Union Luxembourg, a Luxembourgian football club
 Racing Louisville FC, an American women's soccer club
 Racing de Huamachuco, a Peruvian football club
 Royal Racing Club Bruxelles, a Belgian sports club

Other uses 
 Racing (album), a 2004 album by Loudness
 Cartoon Network Racing, a PlayStation 2 video game

See also
 Road racing
 Camel racing
 Horse racing
 Racer (disambiguation)
 Race (disambiguation)